National Software Incorporated is an American software corporation. It has offices in Phoenix, Arizona and Madison, Wisconsin. The company develops software, licenses, maintains and supports software products and related services.

Subsidiary holdings 

National Software Incorporated has several subsidiary holdings:
 LawFirmSoftware.com has law related products including Chapter 7, 11, 13 bankruptcy software.
 1099FIRE.com has software for filing information returns including the popular forms W-2 and 1099-MISC.
 MedClaimSoftware.com has software for completing Medicare health claim forms CMS-1500 and UB-04.

1099FIRE is one of the most popular information return tax preparation software packages in the United States.

History 

The firm was founded in 1964 by attorney John F. Goodson and Judge Keith Mangum in Phoenix, Arizona as LawForms Incorporated and supplied legal forms to the law industry. In 1990 the company transitioned into a legal software company providing software applications to the legal industry.  Today, as the parent company, National Software Incorporated provides software for the law, tax, export and transportation, finance and medical billing industries. Managed by owners Erich Ruth and Robert Huffman, National Software Incorporated continues to develop, innovate and automate.

See also 
 Modernized e-File

References

External links 
 National Software Website

Software companies based in Arizona
Accounting software
Tax software of the United States
Tax preparation companies of the United States
Computer companies established in 1964
Companies based in Phoenix, Arizona
Software companies of the United States
1964 establishments in Arizona